Washington High School (commonly Washington or WHS) is a public high school in Phoenix, Arizona, United States. It serves students from grades 9-12. Washington is a part of the Glendale Union High School District, and opened in 1955 with its first graduating class in 1956.

History 
Washington was designed by the local architecture firm Edward L. Varney Associates. The construction contract to build the school was awarded to D. O. Norton & Son Construction Co. of Phoenix.

Academics
Washington High School offers multiple Advanced Placement classes, these include Physics, Biology, Calculus AB and BC, English Literature, French, Japanese Language and Culture, Spanish, Studio Art, US Government, US History, Photography, World History and more. It has received the 'Excelling' label by the Arizona Board of Education every year for the past 3 years.

After school clubs
WHS's Interact club is one of the largest and most active Interact clubs in the world. The club does community service activities at least twice a week. It is sponsored by the Sun City Rotary club.

Notable alumni and staff
 1967 graduate Charlie Hickcox won three 1968 Olympic Gold medals in swimming.
 1973 graduate Karl Pagel played in the MLB for the Chicago Cubs and the Cleveland Indians.
 1978 graduate Mike Pagel was an All-State quarterback in football. He went on to play the same position at Arizona State University and ultimately in the National Football League. He played for four teams in his 12 NFL seasons.
 1992 graduate Dr. David Gortler is a former Yale University professor of pharmacology who was appointed by the White House to serve on the Senior Executive Leadership Team at the FDA, with the title "Senior Advisor to The FDA Commissioner." 
 1994 graduate Chester Bennington was an American singer and songwriter best known as the frontman for the rock band Linkin Park.

References

External links
 Washington High School
 Glendale Union High School District
 WHS Young Life
 Rams Football

High schools in Phoenix, Arizona
Educational institutions established in 1955
Public high schools in Arizona
1955 establishments in Arizona